Dashti Kalateh-ye Gharbi (also Romanized as Dashtī Kalāteh-ye Gharbī; also known as Dasht Kalāteh-ye Gharbī) is a village in Anzan-e Gharbi Rural District, in the Central District of Bandar-e Gaz County, Golestan Province, Iran. At the 2006 census, its population was 532, in 141 families.

References 

Populated places in Bandar-e Gaz County